A factory inspector is someone who checks that factories comply with regulations affecting them.

UK Factory Inspectorate
The enforcement of UK Factory Acts before that of 1833 had been left to local magistrates, which had meant that any compliance with those acts within the cotton industry to which they applied was effectively voluntary.  The initial role of the Factory Inspectorate was to ensure compliance with the limits on age and working hours for children in the cotton industry, thus protecting them from overwork and injury. Four factory inspectors were appointed, with powers equivalent to a magistrate, the right to enter at will any cotton mill at work, and powers to introduce regulations (without parliamentary approval) to effectively implement the Factory Act. The inspectors were assisted by 'superintendents', who had none of their powers (the lack of a right of entry being a particular weakness). The Factory Act 1844 made the superintendents into 'sub-inspectors' with the right of entry at will. By the same Act, the inspectors lost their magisterial powers and the right to make regulations was transferred to the Home Secretary; a duty to guard machinery was laid on employers (but only where the machinery was in areas accessed by children or young people), the Factory Inspectorate therefore becoming concerned with the adequacy of machine guarding.

In 1893 Mary Paterson and May Tennant were the first two women to become factory inspectors earning £200 a year. Factory Inspectors had existed since 1833 but for the first sixty years they were all men.

H.M. Chief Inspector of Factories. 
A chronological list of Her (His) Majesty’s Chief Inspector of Factories:

See also 

 Factory Acts
 Health and Morals of Apprentices Act 1802

References

 
Health and safety in the United Kingdom